Sherzod Abdurahmonov (born January 12, 1982) is a boxer from Uzbekistan, who participated in the 2004 Summer Olympics for his native Asian country. There he was stopped in the quarterfinals of the Men's Middleweight (– 75 kg) division by Russia's eventual runner-up Gaydarbek Gaydarbekov. He qualified for the Athens Games by ending up in second place at the 1st AIBA Asian 2004 Olympic Qualifying Tournament in Guangzhou, PR China. In the final he lost to China's Ha Dabateer.

Notes
sports-reference

1982 births
Olympic boxers of Uzbekistan
Middleweight boxers
Living people
Boxers at the 2004 Summer Olympics
Uzbekistani male boxers
21st-century Uzbekistani people